Porokeratotic eccrine ostial and dermal duct nevus is a skin lesion that resembles a comedonal nevus, but it occurs on the palms and soles where pilosebaceous follicles are normally absent. It is probably transmitted by paradominant transmission.

See also 
 Prominent inferior labial artery
 List of cutaneous conditions

References 

Dermal and subcutaneous growths